Jimmy Crute (born 4 March 1996) is an Australian professional mixed martial artist. He currently competes in the Light Heavyweight division in the Ultimate Fighting Championship (UFC). Crute was the former Australian Hex Fight Series Light Heavyweight Champion. As of January 24, 2023, he is #12 in the UFC light heavyweight rankings.

Background
Crute comes from a long line of boxers on both parents’ sides, and his parents got him started in Karate at age four and Judo at eight. Crute started training Brazilian Jiu-Jitsu at the age of 11, however, it wasn't until he was 12 that discovered MMA. When he was 19, he made his professional debut in the Hex Fight Series in Melbourne, winning with a first round submission.

Mixed martial arts career

Early career
Crute fought exclusively in Hex Fight Series in Australia where he won the light heavyweight championship and defended it twice. He amassed a record of 7–0 with two TKOs and two submissions prior to competing on Dana White's Contender Series.

Dana White's Contender Series 
Crute faced Chris Birchler on Dana White's Contender Series 14 web-series program on 24 July 2018. He won the fight via technical knockout in round one and was awarded a UFC contract.

Ultimate Fighting Championship
Crute made his promotional debut on 2 December 2018 against Paul Craig at UFC Fight Night 142. He won the fight via kimura in the third round.

Crute faced Sam Alvey on 10 February 2019 at UFC 234. He won the fight via technical knockout in round one.

Crute faced Misha Cirkunov on 14 September 2019 at UFC Fight Night 158. He lost the back-and-forth fight via a Peruvian necktie submission in the first round.

Crute faced Michał Oleksiejczuk on 23 February 2020 at UFC Fight Night 168. He won the fight via a kimura submission in the first round. This win earned him a Performance of the Night award.

Crute faced Modestas Bukauskas on 18 October 2020 at UFC Fight Night: Ortega vs. The Korean Zombie. He won the fight via knockout in round one. This win earned him the Performance of the Night award.

Crute was scheduled to face Johnny Walker on 27 March 2021 at UFC 260. However, Walker pulled out of the fight in early February citing a chest injury. Subsequently, promotion officials elected to remove Crute from the card and reschedule him against Anthony Smith the following month at UFC 261. He lost the fight via doctor stoppage before the second round after suffering foot drop as a result of a leg kick by Smith, which rendered him unable to continue.

As the first bout of his new, four-fight contract, Crute was scheduled to face Jamahal Hill on 2 October 2021 at UFC Fight Night 193. However in early September, the bout was rescheduled to 4 December 2021 at UFC on ESPN: Font vs. Aldo. Crute lost the fight via knockout in round one.

Crute faced Alonzo Menifield on February 12, 2023, at UFC 284. The fight ended in a majority draw.

Championships and achievements

Mixed martial arts
Ultimate Fighting Championship
 Performance of the Night (Two times) 
Hex Fight Series
 Hex Fight Series Light Heavyweight Champion (one time)
 Two successful title defenses

Personal life
Crute was a full-time forklift driver prior to being signed by the UFC.

Mixed martial arts record

|-
|Draw
|align=center|
|Alonzo Menifield
|Draw (majority)
|UFC 284
|
|align=center|3
|align=center|5:00
|Perth, Australia 
|
|-
|Loss
|align=center|12–3
|Jamahal Hill
|KO (punches)
|UFC on ESPN: Font vs. Aldo
|
|align=center|1
|align=center|0:48
|Las Vegas, Nevada, United States
|
|-
|Loss
|align=center|12–2
|Anthony Smith
|TKO (doctor stoppage)
|UFC 261
|
|align=center|1
|align=center|5:00
|Jacksonville, Florida, United States
|
|-
|Win
|align=center|12–1
|Modestas Bukauskas
|KO (punches)
|UFC Fight Night: Ortega vs. The Korean Zombie
|
|align=center|1
|align=center|2:01
|Abu Dhabi, United Arab Emirates
|
|-
|Win
|align=center|11–1
|Michał Oleksiejczuk
|Submission (kimura)
|UFC Fight Night: Felder vs. Hooker
|
|align=center|1
|align=center|3:29
|Auckland, New Zealand
|
|-
|Loss
|align=center|10–1
|Misha Cirkunov
|Submission (Peruvian necktie)
|UFC Fight Night: Cowboy vs. Gaethje
|
|align=center|1
|align=center|3:38
|Vancouver, British Columbia, Canada
|
|-
|Win
|align=center|10–0
|Sam Alvey
|TKO (punches)
|UFC 234
|
|align=center|1
|align=center|2:49
|Melbourne, Australia 
|
|-
|Win
|align=center|9–0
|Paul Craig
|Submission (kimura)
|UFC Fight Night: dos Santos vs. Tuivasa
|
|align=center|3
|align=center|4:51
|Adelaide, Australia
|
|-
|Win
|align=center|8–0
|Chris Birchler
|TKO (punches)
|Dana White's Contender Series 14
|
|align=center|1
|align=center|4:23
|Las Vegas, Nevada, United States
|
|-
|Win
|align=center|7–0
|Kim Doo-hwan
|Decision (unanimous)
|Hex Fight Series 13
|
|align=center|5
|align=center|5:00
|Melbourne, Australia
|
|-
|Win
|align=center|6–0
|Steven Warby
|Decision (unanimous)
|Hex Fight Series 12
|
|align=center|5
|align=center|5:00
|Melbourne, Australia
|
|-
|Win
|align=center|5–0
|Benjamin Kelleher
|Submission (arm-triangle choke)
|Hex Fight Series 9
|
|align=center|1
|align=center|1:23
|Melbourne, Australia
|
|-
|Win
|align=center|4–0
|Nathan Reddy
|TKO (punches)
|Hex Fight Series 8
|
|align=center|1
|align=center|4:59
|Melbourne, Australia
|
|-
|Win
|align=center|3–0
|Matt Eland
|TKO (punches and elbows)
|Hex Fight Series 7
|
|align=center|1
|align=center|2:55
|Melbourne, Australia
|
|-
|Win
|align=center|2–0
|Mike Turner
|Decision (unanimous)
|Hex Fight Series 6
|
|align=center|3
|align=center|5:00
|Melbourne, Australia
|
|-
|Win
|align=center|1–0
|Ben Kelleher
|Submission (armbar)
|Hex Fight Series 5
|
|align=center|1
|align=center|4:01
|Melbourne, Australia
|
|-

See also
 List of current UFC fighters
 List of male mixed martial artists

References

External links
 
  

1996 births
Living people
Australian male mixed martial artists
Sportsmen from Victoria (Australia)
Australian practitioners of Brazilian jiu-jitsu
People awarded a black belt in Brazilian jiu-jitsu
Australian male judoka
Australian male karateka
Light heavyweight mixed martial artists
Ultimate Fighting Championship male fighters
Mixed martial artists utilizing Brazilian jiu-jitsu
Mixed martial artists utilizing judo
Mixed martial artists utilizing karate